Clayton Township is a township in Clayton County, Iowa, USA.  As of the 2000 census, its population was 312.

History
Clayton Township was named for John M. Clayton, as was Clayton County.

Geography
According to the USGS, it contains four cemeteries: Clayton, Evangelical Lutheran, Norsk Lutheran and Tangeman.

The streams of Moody Run and Sny Magill Creek run through this township.

Notes

References
 USGS Geographic Names Information System (GNIS)

External links
 US-Counties.com
 City-Data.com

Townships in Clayton County, Iowa
Townships in Iowa